Abdul Wahid Hasyim (June 1, 1914 – April 19, 1953) was the first Minister of Religious Affairs in the government of President Sukarno of Indonesia, a post he held in 1945, and from 1949 to 1952.

He was the son of Nahdlatul Ulama founder Hasyim Asy'ari and went on to lead the organization. In the future his son, Abdurrahman Wahid, also held the same office in NU, and later was elected as President of Indonesia in 1999.

One of the main roads in central Jakarta, Jalan Wahid Hasyim, is named after him.

Early life 
Hasyim was born in 1914 as a child of Hasyim Asy'ari and one of his wives, Nafiqoh. Both Asy’ari and Nafiqoh hailed from ulema families in East Java. Hasyim is Asy'ari's first-born male and his fifth child. He spent most of his childhood in Jombang, which included attending a pesantren that his father founded, Pesantren Tebuireng. By 1926, he had finished his schooling in Tebuireng and spent two years continuing his education in various East Java pesantren as was the tradition at the time.

Following his hajj pilgrimage in 1932 with one his cousins, Muhammad Ilyas, Hasyim spent two more years in Saudi Arabia to further his study of Islamic hadith and fiqh. On returning to Jombang, he made several education reforms to the pesantren his father owns, including incorporating a general education system alongside the Islamic one. His experience in Saudi Arabia also led him to start learning foreign languages, such as English, German, and Dutch.

Personal life 
Hasyim married his cousin, Solehah, in 1939. He met Solehah in a wedding ceremony in the same year. From this marriage, the couple had six children: Abdurrahman Wahid, Aisyah Hamid Baidlowi, Salahuddin Wahid, Umar Wahid, Lily Chodijah Wahid, and Hasyim Wahid.

Death 
Hasyim died following a traffic accident on April 18, 1953 where the vehicle that he was riding on collided with a truck in Cimindi. His son, Abdurrahman Wahid, and Argo Sutjipto, the secretary of the central board of Nahdlatul Ulama, were also occupying the vehicle during the incident. Hasyim and Sutjipto were severely injured and it took four hours before they were able to be transported to the nearest medical center, Borromeus Hospital. Wahid survived the crash, but Hasyim died on April 19, followed by Sutjipto the very next day.

References
 
    5. https://www.tebuireng.co/kh-wahid-hasyim-dalam-perjalanan-panjang-kemerdekaan/

External links

1914 births
1953 deaths
Government ministers of Indonesia
Indonesian collaborators with Imperial Japan
Indonesian Muslims
Members of the Central Advisory Council
National Heroes of Indonesia
People from Jombang Regency
Wahid family